The 32nd Hong Kong Film Awards presentation ceremony took place in Hong Kong Cultural Centre on 13 April 2013. The hosts for the awards ceremony were  Eric Tsang, Ronald Cheng, Gordon Lam, Jerry Lamb
. TVB, Now TV and RTHK Radio 2 were the live broadcasters of the ceremony, with other networks airing simultaneously around the world.

Awards
Winners are listed first, highlighted in boldface, and indicated with a double dagger.

Special awards

Presenters
Best Film
 Andy Lau, Carina Lau
Best Director
 Aaron Kwok 
Best Screenplay
 Giddens Ko
Best Actor
 Deanie Ip, Anthony Wong
Best Actress
 Jacky Cheung
Best Supporting Actor
 Nick Cheung, Miriam Yeung
Best Supporting Actress
 Andrew Lau, Gigi Leung
Best Cinematography, Best Film Editing
 Stephen Fung
Best Art Direction, Best Costume and Makeup Design
 Alex Man, Janice Man
Best Action Choreography
 Eric Tsang, Chrissie Chau
Best Sound Design, Best Visual Effects
 Lo Hoi-pang
Best Original Film Score, Best Original Film Song
 Mavis Fan, Choi Siwon
Best New Director, Best New Performer
 Chapman To, Pang Ho-cheung
Best Film of Mainland and Taiwan
 Jackie Chan
Lifetime Achievement Award
 Raymond Chow
Professional Achievement Award
 Wong Kar-wai

Performances 
 Love Only Love, Lan Kwai Fong 2 by Leo Ku
 Zui Fung Zheng Dek Fung Zheng, Diva by Mag Lam 
 Ding Feng Bo, The Last Tycoon by Jacky Cheung
 Anthony Wong (Tribute to Leslie Cheung and Anita Mui; both died 10 years ago)
True

References

External links
 Official website of the Hong Kong Film Awards
 Hong Kong Film Awards 2013 University of Hong Kong Library 

2013
2013 film awards
2013 in Hong Kong
Hong